Marc Rhoades (May 10, 1961) is a Republican former member of the Kansas House of Representatives, representing the 72nd District. He served in the House from 2007 to 2017.

Current committee assignments
 Appropriations (Chair)

Past committee membership
 Taxation
 Higher Education (Vice-Chair)
 Social Services Budget (Vice-Chair)
 Joint Committee on State-Tribal Relations

Major donors
The top 5 donors to Rhoades' 2008 campaign:
 American Legislative Exchange Council (ALEC) $1,800
 Kansas Hospital Assoc $1,000
 Fourth Dist Republican Comm $1,000
 Kansas Medical Society $1,000
 Watchous, Klee & Jennifer $1,000

References

External links
 Kansas Legislature - Marc Rhoades
 Project Vote Smart profile
 Kansas Votes profile
 State Surge - Legislative and voting track record
 Campaign contributions: 2006, 2008

Republican Party members of the Kansas House of Representatives
Living people
21st-century American politicians
1961 births
Kansas State University alumni